The Ford Pinto engine was the unofficial name for a four-cylinder internal combustion engine built by Ford Europe. In Ford sales literature, it was referred to as the EAO or OHC engine and because it was designed to the metric system, it was sometimes called the "metric engine". The internal Ford codename for the unit was the T88-series engine. European Ford service literature refers to it as the Taunus In-Line engine (hence the TL codenames). In North America it was known as the Lima In-Line (LL), or simply the Lima engine due to its being manufactured at Lima Engine in Lima, Ohio.

It was used in many European Ford cars and was exported to the United States to be used in the Ford Pinto, a successful subcompact car of the 1970s, hence the name which is used most often for the unit. In Britain, it is commonly used in many kit cars and hot rods, especially in the 2-litre size.

Pinto OHC (TL)
In Europe, the Pinto OHC was introduced in 1970 to replace the Essex V4 used in the Corsair as that range was subsumed into the Mk3 Cortina and Taunus V4 for the German Fords range (mainly the new Taunus TC). It was the first Ford engine to feature a belt-driven overhead camshaft (thus the name). Early Pinto engines suffered from excessive cam and follower wear, this was later addressed by nitriding the cam lobes and followers, and the fitment of a spray bar, which sprayed oil directly at the camshaft. All standard production Pinto engines had a cast iron cylinder block and a cast iron, crossflow, single overhead camshaft cylinder head with two valves per cylinder operated by finger followers.

Applications:
 Ford Taunus/Ford Cortina (TC1 (1970-76), TC2 (1976-82))
 Ford Escort Mk1 RS2000
 Ford Escort Mk2 RS2000, Mexico 
 Ford Capri (Mk2 & Mk3 (1974-86))
 Ford Sierra (1982-1992)
 Ford Granada Mk1&2 (Mk1 (1974-77); Mk2 (1977-85))
 Ford Scorpio/Granada Mk3
 Ford Transit (1978-1994)
 TVR Tasmin 200

Later . Due to emission requirements, it was phased out towards the end of the 1980s to be replaced by the CVH engine and DOHC engine, the latter being (contrary to popular belief) a completely new design and not a twin-cam development of the Pinto unit. The only DOHC direct derivative of Pinto engine is the Cosworth YB 16-valve engine, powering Ford Sierra and Ford Escort RS Cosworth variants and featuring a cast aluminium alloy cylinder head developed specially by Cosworth fitted to a modified Pinto cast iron block.

The final Pinto engines used in Ford of Europe production vehicles were the  litre versions used in the Sierra until 1991, and the last  units were used in the Transit until 1994.

1.3 (TL13)
It was produced in two compression ratio versions:
 TL13L – the low compression (LC) variant, which developed  /  depending on carburetor model, had a compression ratio of 8.0:1 and the engine codes started with 'JA'
 TL13H — the high compression (HC) variant, which developed  /  depending on carburetor model had a compression ratio of 9.0:1 and the engine codes started with 'JC'
The fuel was supplied by the Motorcraft single-barrel (1V) carburetor in the early models (until April 1979), and Motorcraft VV ("variable venturi") carburetor for the vehicles built after April 1979.

Applications:
 1970–1982 Ford Taunus (engine codes JAA/JCA, JAC/JCC, JAR/JCR)
 1972–1974 Ford Capri (engine code JCE)
 1982–1984 Ford Sierra (engine code JCT)

1.6 (TL16)

Early low compression variant (TL16L)
As the 1.3 L model, it used the Motorcraft 1V and, later, the Motorcraft VV carburetors. The engine code of the low compression variant started with 'LA'.

Applications:
 1970–1982 Ford Taunus / Ford Cortina (engine codes LAA, LAD, LAR)
 1979–1986 Ford Transit (engine code LAT)
 1975–1985 Ford Capri (engine codes LAC, LAN)

Early high compression variant (TL16H)
It used the same carburetor models as the low compression version (Motorcraft 1V and Motorcraft VV).

Applications:
 1970–1982 Ford Taunus / Ford Cortina (engine codes LCA, LCJ, LCR)
 1982–1984 Ford Sierra (engine codes LCT, LCS)
 1975–1985 Ford Capri (engine codes LCE, LCN)
 1981–1985 Ford Granada (engine code LCK)
 1983–1984 Anadol A8-16 SL

Increased performance (GT) variant (TL16G)
From the beginning of the production run, the  had a special, 'sporty' version which featured:
 modified cylinder head (larger inlet valves and 2.0 L camshaft with higher valve lifts)
 DGAV 32/36 Weber carburetor
 tubular exhaust manifold

Applications:
 1970–1973 Ford Taunus GT (engine code LEA)
 1970–1976 Ford Taunus GXL (engine code LEA)
1970-1976 Ford Cortina GT (engine code LEA)
 1970–1976 Ford Cortina GXL (engine code LEA)
 1976–1982 Ford Taunus / Ford Cortina S / GLS / Ghia S (engine codes LEC, LEE)
 1975–1978 Ford Escort Mexico
 1972–1976 Ford Capri GT (engine codes LEC, LEE)

Late variant (TL16E)
At the beginning of 1984, Ford Pinto engine displacement range switched from 1.3/1.6/2.0 to 1.6/1.8/2.0. The newly introduced 1.8 L engine used the 2.0 L crankshaft, so to uniform engine parts for the whole range after dropping the 1.3 L — the 1.6 L was redesigned to also take the 2.0 L crankshaft which had a  stroke. The TL16E became now the only available 1.6 L engine of the Pinto range.
This engine is sometimes referred to as 1.6 E-Max engine.

Applications:
 1984–1989 Ford Sierra (engine codes LSE, LSD)

1.8 (TL18H)
Fuel was supplied by the Pierburg 2E3 28/32 carburetor.

Applications:
 1984–1989 Ford Sierra (engine codes REB, RED, REF)
 1985–1992 Ford Scorpio (engine code REC)

2.0 (TL20)
The  was used in many Ford vehicles from the early 1970s. Due to its robustness and high tuning potential, it was often used as an aftermarket engine upgrade or base for building race and rally engines — not exclusively in Ford cars.
It was manufactured in several variants:

Low compression variant (TL20L)
Three completely different LC variants of the 2.0 L were produced.
The second one was used on 1978–1991 Ford Transits and P100 models. The compression ratio in this case was also 8.2:1. The Transits also used the third variant called the "Economy" engine. The power figure of this one was even lower — it developed only .

Applications:
 1970–1982 Ford Taunus Sweden export version (engine code NA)
 1978–1994 Ford Transit (engine codes NAT, NAV, NAW, NAX, NBA)
 1988–1993 Ford P100 (engine code NAE)
 1977–1986 Ford Transit "Economy" version (engine code NUT)

Standard (high compression) variant (TL20H)
Although Ford marked its standard 2.0 L engine as HC, it actually uses engine codes meant for the 'increased performance variant' engines (coding starting with 'NE'), these have a compression ratio of to 9.2:1.
This engine used different carburetor models across the years:
 Weber DGAV 32/36 - on all cars up to 1987
 Weber DFTH 30/34 - from 1987 until the end of production run (1989)
 Weber DFAV 32/36 - on engines exported to USA

Applications:
 1973–1980 Ford Escort RS2000 (engine codes NEA, NE)
 1974–1982 Ford Taunus / Ford Cortina (engine codes NEG, NER)
 1975–1985 Ford Capri (engine codes NEE, NEN)
 1973–1984 Ford Granada (engine codes NEB, NEH, NEK)
 1983–1989 Ford Sierra (engine codes NES, NET, NEJ, NE5)
 1985–1989 Ford Granada and Ford Scorpio (engine code NEL, NER, NE4)
 1971–1974 Ford Pinto

Injection variant (TL20EFI)
As the EEC-IV installation on most of those engines contains some Bosch parts that are easily visible in the engine compartment (air flow meter of the electromechanical "flap" type, injectors, fuel pressure regulator etc.), it is often - but falsely believed that they are fitted with the Bosch L-Jetronic injection system.
Some of the TL20EFI engines have closed-loop lambda control, while others are lacking that feature.

Applications:
 1985–1992 Ford Sierra (engine codes N4, NRD, N4B: 74 kW; NRB, NR2, N4A, N4I: 85 kW)
 1985–1992 Ford Granada and Ford Scorpio (engine code NRA, NRC, NRI)
 1991–1994 Ford Transit (engine code NCA)

Single point injection variant (TL20CFI)
This variant was used in Ford Transit exclusively.

Applications:
 1985–1992 Ford Transit (engine code N6T)

Cosworth YB (CH20EFI)
In the beginning of the 1980s, Cosworth developed a 16-valve performance head conversion for the Pinto engine. This was seen by a Ford executive who asked Cosworth to develop it with a turbo for use in the new Ford Sierra RS Cosworth.
The engine is therefore based on a modified Pinto block topped with the Cosworth-developed alloy head and Garrett turbo.

Lima OHC (LL)

2.0
The 2.0 litre version was a narrower-bore version of the original 2.3 liter "Lima" four. This engine was installed in the 1983-1988 Ford Rangers and in some Argentinian Ford Taunus.

Applications
 Ford Ranger (North America)
 Ford Taunus Argentina models

2.3 (LL23)

The Ford Pinto used the OHC version, a  unit introduced in 1974 which has a  bore and  stroke. This version lasted until 1997 in various guises. This engine has also been known as the Lima engine, after the Lima Engine plant in Lima, Ohio, where it was first manufactured (it was also manufactured in Brazil starting in 1974).

In 1979-80, a draw-through, non-intercooled turbo version was produced for Mustang Cobras and some Capris. Lack of dealership and owner training resulted in many stuck turbochargers and other maintenance problems. It was used in this carbureted form in a number of passenger cars, from the Fairmont Futura Turbo to the 1979 Indy Pace Car edition Mustang.

In 1983, Ford introduced a fuel-injected version of the turbocharged engine, which was used in the Thunderbird Turbo Coupe and the Turbo GT trim of the Mustang. After the SVO was discontinued, the intercooler was added to the Turbo Coupe.

A dual-spark version (with two spark plugs per cylinder, distributor-less ignition, and reduced main bearing sizes) was introduced in the 1989 Ford Ranger and 1991 Ford Mustang.

Applications
 Naturally aspirated
 1986-1987 Ford Aerostar
 1977-1982 Ford Courier
 1974-1980 Ford Pinto
 1983-1997 Ford Ranger/Mazda B-Series (North America)
 1974-1993 Ford Mustang
 1975–1979 Ford Maverick Brazilian models
 Ford Jeep CJ-5 Brazilian models
 Ford Rural, F-75 pick up Brazilian models
 Ford Taunus Argentina models
 Ford Sierra Argentina models
 Ford Falcon (Argentina)
 1978-1983 Ford Fairmont
 1974-1980 Mercury Bobcat
 1979-1986 Mercury Capri
 1978-1983 Mercury Zephyr
 1983–1986 Ford LTD
 1983-1986 Mercury Marquis

 Turbo
 1979–1981 Ford Mustang
 1979-1981 Mercury Capri
 1980 Ford Fairmont (all body styles except wagons)
 1980 Mercury Zephyr (all body styles except wagons)
 1985–1989 Merkur XR4Ti
 1983–1986 Thunderbird Turbo Coupe
 1984–1986 Mercury Cougar XR7
 1983–1984 Mustang Turbo GT (W Code)
 1983–1984 Capri Turbo RS
 Turbo/Intercooler
 1984–1986 Ford Mustang SVO
 1987–1988 Ford Thunderbird Turbo Coupe

2.5 (LL25)
A stroked by  version of the 2.3 OHC Ford Ranger engine appeared in 1998 yielding 2504 cc. In addition to the longer stroke, it used higher-flow cylinder heads utilizing narrower  valve stems. Crankshaft counterbalance weights were increased in count from 4 to 8. It was replaced in 2001 by the Mazda-derived Duratec 23, but Ford Power Products continues to sell this engine as the LRG-425.

Applications:
 1998–2001 Ford Ranger
 1998–2001 Mazda B2500

References

See also
 List of Ford engines

Pinto
Gasoline engines by model
Straight-four engines